Pimdao "Pim" Sukhahuta (born in 1979) is a Thai fashion designer and the creative director of Sretsis. Sretsis (or sisters spell backward), is the fashion brand that was invented by the three sisters, Pim, Kly and Matina Sukhahuta, in 2002. Pim is the middle sister.

Early life
Pim started to notice her designer dreams since she had a chance to sew a prom dress for her younger sisters, and it was only after she went to a proper fashion school that made her realize that this could become a serious profession. Sretsis has gradually moved to the forefront of the fashion world with the famous press recognition and stocklist worldwide, with her elder sister Kly, taking care of marketing. Her youngest sister Matina designs jewelry for Sretsis.

Pim graduated from the Parsons School of Design in New York in 2003, with a degree in fashion design. Pim opened a store and showcased two fashion shows. The first collection of Sretsis is called "heart", shown in Elle Fashion Week 2003. In 2004, Sretsis was chosen to be involved with "White" fair in Milan and the following year Sretsis opened the first showrooms in America, Australia and Japan. In 2014 Sretsis opened their first flagship store abroad in Aoyama, Tokyo, known as "Sretsis Inn"(4).

Pim did an internship with Mark Jacobs. Her brand is driven by a strong vision of the woman that they are designing for. They design with a signature dream-like silhouettes and whimsical prints combining with the elegant look. The Sretsis aesthetic, dreamy femininity with unexpected modern twists, and often topped off with a sense of humor (Pims, 2015).

References

Pimdao Sukhahuta
Pimdao Sukhahuta
1979 births
Living people